The Sins of Thy Beloved was a death-doom/gothic metal band from Bryne, Norway, founded in 1996.

Biography 
The band was formed in November 1996 by Glenn Morten Nordbø, Arild Christensen, and Stig Johansen. The band was initially called Purgatory, but they soon decided to change their name to something less common. Anita Auglend and Ola Aarrestad joined the band shortly thereafter, and they recorded their first demo All Alone in January–February 1997.

Anders Thue and Ingfrid Stensland then joined before they recorded their second demo Silent Pain in January 1998. Pete Johansen played the violin on that demo, although he did not officially join the band until the recording of their first full-length album Lake of Sorrow later in 1998.

They toured across Europe, before recording their second full-length album Perpetual Desolation in 2000. During the following tour, Anita Auglend, Anders Thue, and Ingfrid Stensland grew weary of traveling and left the band in 2001. A live performance was released on CD and VHS in 2001, but it was not distributed worldwide and is thus very hard to come by.

The band has been dormant since the departure of its three members. Pete Johansen has since left to play the violin on several Tristania and Sirenia albums. In 2007, it was rumored that Anita Auglend had returned to the band, although these rumors were never confirmed. It was eventually revealed in a  blog interview conducted by Class of Sounds with Pete Johansen that the band actually had dissolved in 2002.

In 2013, band members Anders Thue and Stig Johansen formed the band Savn with Midnattsol singer Carmen Elise Espenæs. In 2016, guitarist, composer, and vocalist Arild Christensen formed the band Rainarea with Nelly Khosrovyan.

Style 
The Sins of Thy Beloved are often compared to gothic metal bands such as Tristania and early Theatre of Tragedy, mainly because of the band's combination of a female soprano voice with male death grunt; this trait is common to gothic metal in general, and is known as "beauty and the beast" vocals. Their music features death-doom rhythmics enhanced by the prominent use of violins, especially on the Lake of Sorrow album, typical of many gothic doom bands. Their live recordings offer a sound closer to traditional death metal than their studio albums, which make heavy use of arrangements and effects.

Discography
Studio albums
 Lake of Sorrow (1998)
 Perpetual Desolation (2000)

Live albums
 Live (2002)

Video albums
 Perpetual Desolation Live (2001)

EPs
 All Alone (1997)

Demo albums
 The Sins of Thy Beloved (1997)

Line-up

Last known line-up
 Anita Auglend - vocals (1996–2001, 2007–2008)
 Glenn Morten Nordbø - guitars, harsh vocals (1996–2008)
 Arild Christensen - guitar, backing vocals (1996–2008)
 Ola Aarrestad - bass (1996–2008)
 Stig Johansen - drums (1996–2008)
 Maiken Olaisen - keyboards (2005–2008)

Former members
 Anders Thue - keyboards (1997–2001), (2005–2008 live)
 Ingfrid Stensland - keyboards, piano (1997–2001)
 Pete Johansen - violin (1998–2001)
 Hege-Marie Aanby - vocals (2001)
 Mona Wallin - vocals (2005)

Timeline

References

External links 
 The Sins of Thy Beloved fan page
 The Sins of Thy Beloved page at the BNR Metal Pages
 
 
 

1996 establishments in Norway
2008 disestablishments in Norway
Musical groups from Bryne
Musical groups disestablished in 2008
Musical groups established in 1996
Napalm Records artists
Norwegian doom metal musical groups
Norwegian gothic metal musical groups